Drumcliffe–Rosses Point is a Gaelic Athletic Association club based in north County Sligo, Republic of Ireland, including the villages of Drumcliffe, Rosses Point, Rathcormac and Carney.

Notable players

 Paul Durcan – All Star goalkeeper who won the All-Ireland Senior Football Championship with Donegal and the All-Ireland Senior Club Football Championship with Ballyboden
 Neil Ewing – captained the Sligo senior team

Honours
 Sligo Intermediate Football Championship: (2)
 1992, 2013
 Sligo Junior Football Championship: (4)
 1934, 1958, 1990, 2006
 Sligo Senior Football League (Division 2): (1)
 2016
 Sligo Under 20 Football Championship: (1)
 1991
 Sligo Minor Football Championship: (4)
 1988, 1989, 1990, 1992
 Sligo Under-16 Football Championship: (3)
 1986, 1989, 1990
 Sligo Under-14 Football Championship: (4)
 1987, 1989, 1993, 2016
 Sligo Under-15 Football Championship: (2)
1985, 1988
 Sligo Intermediate Football League Division 3 (ex Div. 2): (2)
 1991, 2009
 Benson Cup: (2)
 1990, 2006
 Sligo U-12 A Football Championship: (2)
 1986, 1988

References

Gaelic games clubs in County Sligo